Henry Warner Slocum, Jr. (May 28, 1862 – January 22, 1949) was an American male tennis player who was active in the late 19th century.

Biography
He was born on May 28, 1862, in Syracuse, New York, to Henry Warner Slocum.

Slocum graduated from Yale University in 1883 and started playing tennis in 1884 although he entered few prominent tournaments until the spring of 1886. Slocum won the 1888 Men's Singles title at the U.S. National Championships' in Newport against defending champion and compatriot Howard Taylor in straight sets. The next year he successfully defended his title in the Challenge Round with a victory over Quincy Shaw.

His other career highlights include winning the Wentworth Open Tournament at Wentworth, New Hampshire, in 1887.

He was president of the United States National Lawn Tennis Association (USNLTA) in 1892 and 1893.

He died on January 22, 1949, at St. Luke's Hospital in Manhattan, New York City.

Legacy
Slocum was inducted into the International Tennis Hall of Fame in 1955. In 1890 he published a book titled Lawn Tennis in Our Own Country.

Grand Slam finals

Singles (2 titles, 2 runners-up)

Doubles (1 title, 2 runners-up)

References

External links 
 
 
 Slocum, Henry, Lawn Tennis in Our Own Country, 1890

 

1862 births
1949 deaths
19th-century male tennis players
American male tennis players
International Tennis Hall of Fame inductees
United States National champions (tennis)
Place of birth missing
Grand Slam (tennis) champions in men's singles
Grand Slam (tennis) champions in men's doubles
Tennis people from New York (state)